Flint Northern High School was a public secondary school located in Flint, Michigan.  The original building "#1" was built in 1928 and demolished in the 1980s, after being the home of the Flint Academy.  It was one of the high schools in the Flint Community Schools district along with Flint Northwestern High School (now Flint Junior High School) and Flint Southwestern Academy. It was closed in 2013 and reopened as Northern Academy. The Flint school board finally closed the school completely in 2014.

Athletics
Its terms were the  Vikings.  The school competed in the Saginaw Valley High School Association and the Michigan High School Athletic Association (MHSAA).

The following teams have won their respective MHSAA state championships.
 Basketball (boys): 1932-33, 35-36, 38-39, 39-40, 46-47, 70-71, 71-72, 77-78, 94-95
 Basketball (girls): 1978-79, 79-80, 80-81, 81-82, 94-95, 95-96
 Cross Country (boys): 1974-75
 Cross Country (girls): 1981-82
 Tennis (boys): 1930-31
 Track & Field (boys): 1949-50, 52-53, 60-61, 62-63, 75-76, 78-79
 Track & Field (girls): 1978-79, 79-80, 80-81, 82-83
 Wrestling: 1962-63, 94-95

Notable alumni
Bunyan Bryant, Professor Emeritus at the University of Michigan
 Wayman Britt is a former professional basketball player.
 Leroy Bolden is a former professional football running back
 Steve Boros - professional baseball player and manager
 J'Nathan Bullock is a former professional basketball player.
 Gregory Burks is a former professional basketball player
 Tony Burton is a former boxer and actor, best known for his work in the Rocky series of films.
 Mateen Cleaves was a professional basketball player.
 Eugene Marve is a former professional football linebacker.
 Mike Miller is a former professional football wide receiver
 Jack Minore was a politician who served in the Flint City Council and the Michigan House of Representatives.
 Deanna Nolan is a professional basketball player, best known for her years with the Detroit Shock.
 Robaire Smith is a professional football defensive end.
 Leo Sugar is a former professional football defensive end
 Dominic Tomasi was a football player for the University of Michigan.
 Fred Trosko was a college football coach at Michigan State Normal College (Eastern Michigan University).  He also returned to Flint Northern and served as an assistant coach.
 Tamika Louis, former head coach of the Delaware State University women's basketball team.
 Dan Kildee, member of the U.S.Congress
 Thomas Rawls is a professional football running back for the Seattle Seahawks.
 Chris Wilson is a former professional football defensive end
 Robert Garth, AFL2 former professional football player

See also
 Flint Community Schools
 Flint Southwestern Academy
 Flint Northwestern

References

External links
 

Public high schools in Michigan
High schools in Flint, Michigan
Educational institutions established in 1928
Public middle schools in Michigan
1928 establishments in Michigan
2013 disestablishments in Michigan
Educational institutions disestablished in 2013